Hsinchu is a railway station in Hsinchu County, Taiwan served by Taiwan High Speed Rail. It opened for service in 2006. The station was designed by Taiwanese architect Kris Yao. Transfers to TRA Liujia station can be made at this station, which links to the Hsinchu TRA station located In Hsinchu City. Hsinchu HSR station is 11 km away from Hsinchu TRA station.

Overview
The station has two side platforms and is the smallest station on the system. The newly opened Taiwan Railway Administration Liujia Line (a spur of the  Neiwan Line) links the high-speed rail station from Liujia station with the TRA Hsinchu Station. Liujia Line opened service on 11 November 2011.

The station was designed by Kris Yao and constructed by Daiho Corporation.

Station layout

HSR services
HSR services (1)5xx, (1)6xx, and (8)8xx call at this station.

Around the station
Highways and Train Stations
National Highway No. 1
Provincial Highway No. 68
Liujia station
Parks
Biomedical Research Park
Knowledge-based Economy Industrial Park
Central Park
Zhubei Activity Park
Ecological Park
Fruit Park
Universities and Schools
National Yang Ming Chiao Tung University
National Taiwan University, Zhubei Campus
National Taiwan University of Science and Technology, Zhubei Campus
Liujia Junior High School
Liujia Elementary School
Science Parks
Hsinchu Science and Industrial Park
Stadiums
Hsinchu County Stadium
Zhubei Arena
Hotels
Sheraton Hsinchu Hotel
Museums
Taiwan Hakka Cultural Center
Shopping Malls
6+Plaza
Sky City
Guangming Shopping Circle
Government Offices
Hsinchu County Government (Hsinchu County Administrative Area)

References

Railway stations served by Taiwan High Speed Rail
Hsinchu
2006 establishments in Taiwan